"The Beacon" is the first segment of the eleventh episode from the first season (1985–86) of the television series The Twilight Zone. In this segment, a doctor is forced to spend the night in a small isolated town whose residents worship a lighthouse ghost.

Plot
A doctor named Dennis Barrows drives along a dirt road in wild backcountry. His car breaks down and he gets out to walk. He crosses a fence with a sign that reads "Private Property – Keep Out" in search of help, and arrives at a coastal town. The owner of the general store, William Cooper-James, says this is a small town with no telephone service or automotive garage. A small boy named Teddy comes to the store on behalf of his mother. He offers their spare room to Dr. Barrows for the night. Dr. Barrows offers to help his sick sister, Katie, but their mother declines.

That night, the lighthouse casts its light on Teddy's house. Teddy gets up and tells Dr. Barrows that he is afraid his sister may die, so Barrows opts to help her against the mother's wishes. Dr. Barrows gives her medicine but Teddy is concerned that his mother will be upset if the lighthouse beacon "picks" Katie. He explains that whenever the beacon shines on a house, shortly after someone in that house dies of sickness or an accident. Dr. Barrows tells Teddy to take him to the beacon in order to reason with Seth, the lighthouse keeper.

The townspeople determine that the beacon has picked Katie, but she is recovering from her illness. Katie tells them what Barrows did. Dr. Barrows and Teddy reach the lighthouse, but the door is locked and secured. The townspeople arrive. Cooper-James tells Barrows that Seth is the founder of the town and ancestor of all the residents. When the town stopped being a waypoint for merchant ships, Seth kept the town's economy alive. Seth's spirit controls the lighthouse and protects the town in exchange for their obedience. Years ago, a person chosen to die was spared and the town fell on hard times as a result. Dr. Barrows doesn't believe this, and posits a different explanation: the townspeople are all mad as a result of their inbreeding, the lighthouse beacon is shining haphazardly due to a faulty mechanism, and whenever the beacon shines on a house where no one is sick, Cooper-James murders someone from the household in order to preserve the superstition that the beacon predicts death. Cooper-James maintains that since Katie survived, someone else staying in the house must die, so the people converge on Barrows and kill him.

Release
The original broadcast had an opening scene where Dr. Barrows is talking to a state trooper about a minor car crash. The trooper warns that this is a sparsely populated area of the state and automotive help may be hard to come by, but Dr. Barrows elects to continue on schedule. The DVD version omits that scene and the episode begins with Dr. Barrows driving on the dirt road.

External links
 
 
 Postcards from the Zone episode 1.26 The Beacon

The Twilight Zone (1985 TV series season 1) episodes
1985 American television episodes
Television episodes directed by Gerd Oswald

fr:Le Phare (La Cinquième Dimension)